Dime is the third Spanish album released by Christian rock band Guardian. The album was released in 2001.

The album features several unique characteristics. Whereas the band's previous Spanish albums featured remakes of songs released in their previous albums, this album features only original material written specifically for the Latin American market. It is also the first album not to feature original bassist and band founder, David Bach.

As of 2007, it is the last studio album released by the band.

Track listing
 "Dime, Dime" (Tell me, tell me)
 "Tu Nombre Alabo Hoy" (I praise your name now)
 "Santo Dios" (Holy God)
 "Si A Mi Lado Tu Estas" (If you are by my side)
 "Llévame" (Take me)
 "Eres Dios" (You are God)
 "Un Día" (One day)
 "Loco Debo Estar" (I must be mad)
 "Si Perdiera El Camino" (If I lost the way)
 "Angelina"

Personnel
 Jamie Rowe - vocals
 Karl Ney - drums
 Tony Palacios - guitar, vocals

Guardian (band) albums
2001 albums